

John Joseph Meagher Thompson (20 December 1907 – 19 July 1968) was an Australian poet, writer and radio broadcaster.

Thompson was born in Kew, Victoria, Australia. He was educated at Melbourne Church of England Grammar School and the University of Melbourne, where he obtained a BA in 1929. In 1931 he travelled to London, where he attempted to make a living as a writer.

He was awarded the Grace Leven Prize for Poetry for his collection Thirty Poems in 1954 and wrote poetry throughout his adult life.

He met and married Patricia Drakeford Cole in 1938 and worked at a number of jobs before returning to Australia in early 1939.  The couple landed in Perth, Western Australia, where Thompson got a job as an announcer with the Australian Broadcasting Corporation. In December 1942 he enlisted in the Australian Imperial Force, serving in Australia in an educational capacity, before being discharged from the army on 2 August 1945 to work as a war correspondent for the ABC.

After the war he settled in Sydney where he became a senior feature writer and producer at the ABC and where he remained until retirement in 1968.
 
Thompson and his wife had one son, the film critic Peter Thompson, and adopted another, the actor Jack Thompson. He died in 1968.

Bibliography

Poetry collections 
 Three Dawns Ago (1935)
 Sesame and Other Poems (1944)
 Thirty Poems (1954)
 I Hate and I Love : Poems (1964)

Anthologies
 The Penguin Book of Australian Verse (1958), edited with Kenneth Slessor and R. G. Howarth
 Australian Poetry 1965 (1965)

Non-fiction
 Hubbub in Java (1946) history and politics
 On Lips of Living Men (1962) biography
 Five to Remember (1964) biography

References

1907 births
1968 deaths
20th-century Australian writers
Australian poets
Writers from Melbourne
People from Kew, Victoria
People educated at Melbourne Grammar School
University of Melbourne alumni
Australian expatriates in England